François-Armand-Auguste de Rohan-Soubise, Prince of Tournon, Prince of Rohan (1 December 1717, Paris – 28 June 1756, Saverne) was a French prelate, Prince-Bishop of Strasbourg. His parents, Anne Julie de Melun and Jules, Prince de Soubise, both died of smallpox when he was still a child.

Biography
He received Holy Orders as a Catholic priest on 23 December 1741 and received the position of commendatory abbot first of the Abbey of Ventadour, which was succeeded by that of Saint-Epvre (in the Diocese of Toul) from 1736, and later added was that of Prince-Abbot of the Abbeys of Murbach and of Lure in 1737. He was elected to the Académie française on 15 July 1741.

A year later he was appointed coadjutor bishop of the Diocese of Strasbourg. He was the great-nephew of the incumbent Prince-Bishop, Cardinal Armand Gaston Maximilien de Rohan, and was simultaneously named as the titular bishop in partibus of Ptolemais in Palestine (now Acre, Israel). He was consecrated a bishop on the following 4 November. He was made Grand Almoner of France in 1745 and a cardinal in 1747.

Upon the death of his great-uncle in 1749, he automatically became Prince-Bishop of Strasbourg and became commendatory abbot of the great Abbey of La Chaise-Dieu that same year, giving up that of Saint-Epvre.

He died in 1756 of tuberculosis.

Siblings
Charles de Rohan, Prince of Soubise, Duke of Rohan-Rohan (16 July 1715–4 July 1787) married Anne Marie Louise de La Tour d'Auvergne (1722–1739) and had issue; married again to Princess Anna Teresa of Savoy (1717–1745) and had issue; married Victoire of Hesse-Rotenburg (1728–1792) no issue;
Marie Louise Geneviève de Rohan (7 January 1720–4 March 1803) married Gaston Jean Baptiste de Lorraine, Count of Marsan, no issue;
François Auguste de Rohan, Count of Tournon (16 September 1721–6 August 1736) never married;
René de Rohan, O.S.B., monk of the Abbey of Luxeuil (26 July 1723–7 February 1743) never married.

Ancestry

See also
House of Rohan
Palais Rohan, Strasbourg

References

External links
 Académie française

1717 births
1756 deaths
Clergy from Paris
Bishops of Strasbourg
18th-century French cardinals
Armand de Rohan-Soubise
18th-century deaths from tuberculosis
Members of the Académie Française
Tuberculosis deaths in France